Agrell is a surname. Notable people with this surname include:

 Johan Agrell (1701–1765), Swedish composer
 Alfhild Agrell (1849–1923), Swedish writer
 Sigurd Agrell (1881–1937), Swedish poet, translator, and runologist
 Stuart Olof Agrell (1913–1996), English geologist